Carlo de Angelis (1620 – September 1690) was a Roman Catholic prelate who served as Bishop of Acerra (1674–1690) and Bishop of L'Aquila (1663–1674).

Biography
Carlo de Angelis was born in Naples, Italy in 1620.
On 26 January 1663, he was selected as Bishop of L'Aquila and confirmed by Pope Alexander VII on 13 August 1663.
On 26 August 1663, he was consecrated bishop by Francesco Maria Brancaccio, Bishop of Viterbo e Tuscania, with Giovanni Antonio Capobianco, Bishop of Siracusa, serving as co-consecrator.
On 8 July 1674, he was selected as Bishop of Acerra and confirmed by Pope Clement X on 17 December 1674.
He served as Bishop of Acerra until his death in September 1690.

References

External links and additional sources
 (for Chronology of Bishops) 
 (for Chronology of Bishops) 
 (for Chronology of Bishops) 
 (for Chronology of Bishops) 

17th-century Italian Roman Catholic bishops
Bishops appointed by Pope Alexander VII
Bishops appointed by Pope Clement X
1620 births
1690 deaths